Steve James (February 19, 1952 – December 18, 1993) was an American actor, stunt performer and martial artist. He starred mostly in action films such as the American Ninja series, The Delta Force (1986), The Exterminator (1980), and Avenging Force (1986). James also portrayed Kung Fu Joe in the 1988 comedy/spoof film I'm Gonna Git You Sucka, and its 1990 television pilot spinoff Hammer, Slammer, & Slade.

Life and career
James was born and reared in New York City. His father was trumpet player Hubie James, and his uncle was James Wall, who played Mr. Baxter on the children's television series Captain Kangaroo. His godfather was Joe Seneca who, among many roles, played Danny Glover's character's father in Silverado. Joe Seneca was instrumental in Steve becoming interested in action films as he took him to movies on 42nd Street when he was a child. He graduated from Power Memorial Academy in 1970, then attended C.W. Post College as an Arts and Film major.

Upon graduating he became involved in stage work and TV commercials. James started his film career off as a stunt performer for such New York based film productions as The Wiz, The Warriors, and The Wanderers. He began playing bit parts in the mid 1970s appearing in films such as The Land That Time Forgot (1974) and The Warriors (1979). In the early 1980s, he appeared in several low-budget films such as The Exterminator (1980), He Knows You're Alone (1980) and The Soldier (1982). He also guest-starred in episodes of television series such as T.J. Hooker, E/R and The Dukes of Hazzard. In 1983, he had a part as Ptl. Gibbons in Vigilante.

In 1985 he had a co-starring role alongside Michael Dudikoff in the martial arts action film American Ninja. He reprised his role in its sequels American Ninja 2: The Confrontation (1987) and American Ninja 3: Blood Hunt (1989). During this period, he was often cast as a supporting character or secondary lead in several action films. He co-starred with Chuck Norris in The Delta Force (1986) and Hero and the Terror (1988). He also played supporting roles in films of other genres such as the science-fiction comedy The Brother From Another Planet (1984), the drama Mask (1985) and the sports comedy Johnny Be Good (1988).

He played Kung Fu Joe in the 1988 spoof comedy film I'm Gonna Git You Sucka and reprised his role in the spin-off television film Hammer, Slammer & Slade (1990). He played rare leading roles in the action films Riverbend (1989) and Street Hunter (1990). In 1993, he appeared in the comedy Weekend at Bernie's II which was the last film to be released during his lifetime.

Shortly before his death from cancer in December 1993, he had completed filming the 1994 feature film Bloodfist V: Human Target with Don "The Dragon" Wilson and the pilot for the TV series M.A.N.T.I.S.. The pilot first aired on Fox just a few weeks after his death. He was going to audition to play Jax in the Mortal Kombat film; however, his death caused the studio to have Gregory McKinney replace him.

Death
On December 18, 1993, James died of pancreatic cancer in his home in Burbank, California at age 41.

Eulogies at James' funeral service were delivered by Sidney Poitier (as his widow, Chris, was employed by Mr. Poitier), his father Hubie James, his friend John A. Gallagher and Christine Pan James. His urn resides on the mantle of his home in Burbank, California.

Filmography

Film

Television

Stunts

Writer
Street Hunter (1990)

References

External links
 
 

1952 births
1993 deaths
20th-century American male actors
20th-century African-American people
African-American male actors
American male film actors
American male soap opera actors
American stunt performers
Burials at Hollywood Forever Cemetery
LIU Post alumni
Male actors from New York City
Deaths from cancer in California
Deaths from pancreatic cancer